Erebia ottomana is a small butterfly found in the  East Palearctic (Greece, Bulgaria, Balkans, Alps, Asia Minor) that belongs to the browns family.

Description from Seitz

Erebia ottomana  H.-Schaff. (37 i) is the largest of all the tyndarus forms. Besides the two subapical ocelli the band of the forewing has further back 2 additional small ocelli which are either feebly centred with white or are quite blind. Hindwing beneath uniformly grey. From the Balcan Peninsula, Greece and Armenia, being lately often sold as balcanica .

See also
List of butterflies of Europe

References

Satyrinae